The Mississauga Trilliums are a girls lacrosse association based in Mississauga, Ontario, Canada. The Trilliums are associated with the Mississauga Tomahawks in the Ontario Lacrosse Association and were founded in 2006. The Trilliums play in the Ontario Women's Lacrosse league.

The Trilliums record is:

References

External links
 Mississauga Trilliums
 Ontario Women's Lacrosse

Ontario Lacrosse Association teams
Sport in Mississauga
Women's sports teams in Canada
Women's lacrosse teams
Women's lacrosse in Canada
2006 establishments in Ontario
Lacrosse clubs established in 2006